The women's 3000 metres event  at the 1997 IAAF World Indoor Championships was held on March 8.

Results

References

3000
3000 metres at the World Athletics Indoor Championships
1997 in women's athletics